Stephen 'The lynx'  Gollogly is an Irish  Gaelic footballer who plays for the Carrickmacross Emmets club and at senior level for the Monaghan county team. He finished as the sixth highest scorer in the Ulster Senior Football Championship scoring 7 points. He played in the 2005 Ulster Final defeat to Tyrone in which they lost by 2 points in a scoreline of Tyrone 1-15 Monaghan 1–13. He also played against Kerry in the All-Ireland Senior Football Championship Quarter Final 2007 and they narrowly lost in a score of Kerry 1-12 Monaghan 1–11.

Stephen attended the Patrician High School in Carrickmacross where he won a couple of Ulster Colleges titles, most 
notably the Rannafast Cup. He was also full forward on the MacRory Cup side that lost to eventual winners St. Pats Maghera in the semi-final. He was named at left half forward on the Colleges All-Star team of 2003.

Honours
 Ulster Senior Football Championship (2): 2013, 2015
 National Football League, Division 2 (1): 2005, 2014
 National Football League, Division 3 (1): 2013

References

Year of birth missing (living people)
Living people
Irish schoolteachers
Monaghan inter-county Gaelic footballers
Ulster inter-provincial Gaelic footballers